Sabine Becker (born 13 August 1959) is a German speed skater who competed for East Germany in the 1980 Winter Olympics.

She was born in Karl-Marx-Stadt.

In 1980 she won the silver medal in the 3000 metres event and the bronze medal in the 1500 metres competition.

External links

 

1959 births
German female speed skaters
Speed skaters at the 1980 Winter Olympics
Olympic speed skaters of East Germany
Medalists at the 1980 Winter Olympics
Olympic medalists in speed skating
Olympic silver medalists for East Germany
Olympic bronze medalists for East Germany
Sportspeople from Chemnitz
Living people